Manitoba Housing—legally incorporated as the Manitoba Housing and Renewal Corporation (MHRC)—is a crown corporation under the provincial Department of Families responsible for developing and managing public housing policies and programs in Manitoba.

The agency provides subsidies to around 35,000 housing units in the province.

MHRC is governed by a board of directors, with policy direction provided by the government. The Deputy Minister of Housing and Community Development serves as chair of the board.

References

External links
Manitoba Housing Authority

Housing
Manitoba
Manitoba
Housing